Vedika Khemani (born 1988) is an Indian-American physicist and Assistant Professor at Stanford University. Her research considers many-body systems and condensed matter physics. She was awarded the 2021 American Physical Society George E. Valley Jr. Prize.

Early life and education 
Khemani was born in India and was educated through high-school at La Martiniere Calcutta.  She moved to the United States to study physics at Harvey Mudd College, where she completed a senior thesis on gravitational holography. Her undergraduate thesis was awarded the Thomas Benjamin Brown Memorial Award. Alongside her physics course, Khemani completed courses in economics, linguistics and creative writing. She also took part in robotics programmes and competed at national robotics competitions. After completing her undergraduate degree in 2010, she moved to Princeton University as a graduate student. Here she worked on non-equilibrium phases of matter in Floquet crystals.

Research and career 
As part of her doctoral research, Khemani was part of a team that identified a novel phase of matter, which is now known as a Floquet time-crystal. Such crystals demonstrate spontaneous breaking of time translation symmetry. In conventional crystals, atoms are arranged in regular and ordered patterns, whereas in time crystals they are arranged in both space and time. In 2016, Khemani was made a Harvard Junior Fellow in the Harvard Society of Fellows.

Awards and honours 

 2020 Department of Physics at the University of Illinois McMillan Award
 2020 American Physical Society George E. Valley Jr. Prize
 2020 United States Department of Energy Early Career Award
 2020 Sloan Research Fellowship
 2022 New Horizons in Physics Prize

Select publications

Personal life and education 
In 2013 Khemani married David Coats, whom she met at Harvey Mudd College.

References 

1988 births
Living people
Stanford University faculty
American physicists
Indian condensed matter physicists
Women physicists